The Vancouver Film Critics Circle Award for Best Actor in Canadian Film is an annual award given by the Vancouver Film Critics Circle. In 2000 and 2001 the award was only given to Canadian actors, the last few years every actor who plays in a Canadian production can win the award.

Winners

2000s

2010s

2020s

References

Vancouver Film Critics Circle Awards
Film awards for lead actor